A glyph is an elemental symbol within an agreed set of symbols, intended to represent a readable character for the purposes of writing. More generally, it is any kind of purposeful mark, such as a simple vertical line incised on a building, a single letter in a script, or a carved symbol. 

The word "Glyph" may refer to

Arts, entertainment and media
 Glyph (Transformers), a fictional character
 Glyph (album), by Floater
 Glyph Comics Awards, a comics award

Science and technology
 Glyph (data visualization), any marker, such as an arrow or similar marking, used to specify part of a scientific visualization. 
 Glyph (typography), a letterform

See also
 Anaglyph 3D, Method of representing images in 3D
 Basic Glyphs for Arabic Language, Unicode code block Arabic Presentation Forms-B
 Builder's signature, Tradesperson's signature on constructed project
 Glyph Bitmap Distribution Format, a file format for fonts
 Hieroglyph (disambiguation)
 Maya script, also known as "Maya glyphs"
 Triglyph, an architectural term for the vertically channelled tablets of the Doric frieze in classical architecture
 Petroglyph – Images carved on a rock surface as a form of rock art